Abibata Shanni Mahama Zakariah was born in Yendi and is the daughter of Alhaji Shanni Mahama, who was a former MP for Yendi Constituency and a Deputy Minister for Agriculture in the government of former prime minister K. A. Busia. She was appointed Deputy CEO of the Microfinance and Small Loans Centre (MASLOC) in 2017 and got elevated to the position of substantive Chief Executive in September 2021 after her immediate boss, Stephen Amoah, left to start a career as Parliamentarian for the Nhyiaso Constituency.

Personal life and education 
She attended University of Ghana where she graduated with a Bachelor of Arts degree in Psychology. She also has a Master of Public Policy and Administration (MPPA) degree from the School of International and Public Affairs (SIPA) of Columbia University in New York City with focus on Economic and Political Development.

She is married with four children.

Career 
She is a Ghanaian Banker, policy practitioner, business development strategist and a politician. She has extensive work experience from different local and international organisations such as the Agricultural Development Bank (Ghana), The Millennium Cities Initiative – MCI in collaboration with Earth Institute of Columbia University (Accra, Ghana), Consultancy for The Capacity Development Group (UNDP, New York), Merchant Bank Ghana Limited (Accra, Ghana) and Jospong Group of Companies (Accra, Ghana).

Before the 2020 general elections, she contested to represent her party, the New Patriotic Party as its parliamentary candidate for the Yendi constituency. She lost to Farouk Aliu Mahama, son of late former Vice President Alhaji Aliu Mahama.

References

Women members of the Parliament of Ghana
Year of birth missing (living people)
Living people
Ghanaian Muslims
People from Yendi
University of Ghana alumni
School of International and Public Affairs, Columbia University alumni
Ghanaian bankers
Ghanaian chief executives
Women chief executives
New Patriotic Party politicians
Ghanaian business executives